The Ministry of Defence (MOD) is the governmental body in the Sultanate of Oman responsible for all matters relating to the defence of the state.

The current Minister of Defence is Haitham bin Tariq.

References

External links 
 "National Security" page on the website of the Ministry of Information

Government of Oman